The Usagi Yojimbo Role-Playing Game is the second role-playing game to be published based on Stan Sakai's Eisner-award-winning comic-book series Usagi Yojimbo. (The first, Usagi Yojimbo Roleplaying Game, was written by Greg Stolze and published in 1998 by Gold Rush Games.) The 2005 game is written by Jason Holmgren and Pieter van Hiel, published by Sanguine Productions in 2005.

The game is set in a fantasy version of Japan in the Edo period (beginning of the 17th century) and uses a heavily modified variant of the systems used in Sanguine Productions' other role-playing games Ironclaw, Jadeclaw, and Albedo: Platinum Catalyst.

In late October 2006, a version of the game translated into Spanish was released. A second edition of the 2005 version was successfully Kickstarted in 2019.

References

External links
 Official web site

Usagi Yojimbo
Fantasy role-playing games
Furry role-playing games
Historical role-playing games
Martial arts role-playing games
Role-playing games introduced in 2005
Role-playing games based on comics
Fantasy role-playing games based on anime and manga